Cacia ligata is a species of beetle in the family Cerambycidae. It was described by Schwarzer in 1924. It is known from Papua New Guinea.

References

Cacia (beetle)
Beetles described in 1924